Dóra Lőwy (born June 28, 1977) is a Hungarian former handball player and Olympic medalist. She received a silver medal at the 2000 Summer Olympics in Sydney with the Hungarian national team.

Achievements
Nemzeti Bajnokság I:
Winner: 1994, 1995, 1996, 1997, 2000, 2002
Magyar Kupa:
Winner: 1994, 1995, 1996, 1997
Women Handball Austria:
Winner: 2004, 2005
ÖHB Cup:
Winner: 2004, 2005
EHF Cup Winners' Cup:
Finalist: 1994
Olympic Games:
Silver Medalist: 2000

References

External links

1977 births
Living people
People from Tata, Hungary
Hungarian female handball players
Olympic silver medalists for Hungary
Handball players at the 2000 Summer Olympics
Olympic medalists in handball
Expatriate handball players
Hungarian expatriate sportspeople in Austria
Medalists at the 2000 Summer Olympics
Sportspeople from Komárom-Esztergom County